Lámh Dhearg is a Gaelic Athletic Association club based on the Upper Springfield Road in west Belfast, County Antrim, Northern Ireland. It was established in 1903 and plays Gaelic football, ladies' Gaelic football, handball, and hurling.

Lámh Dhearg
The club's name means "Red Hand" in Irish, referring to the traditional symbol of Ulster. Its supporters use the motto Lámh Dhearg Abú, an old war-cry meaning "the Red Hand forever".

Honours
Ulster Junior Club Hurling Championship (1)
2016
Antrim Intermediate Hurling Championship (1)
2011
Antrim Junior Hurling Championship (2)
1972, 2016
Ulster Minor Club Football Championship (1)
2010
Antrim Senior Football Championship (4)
1929, 1971, 1992, 2017
Antrim Football League Division 1 (5)
Antrim Football League Division 2 (1)
Antrim Football League Division 3 (1)
Antrim Football League Division 4 (3)
Antrim Minor Football Championship (3)
1986, 1992, 2010
Antrim Minor Hurling Championship (1)
1992
Antrim Minor Football League (3)
Antrim Intermediate Hurling Championship (2)
Antrim Hurling League Division 2 (1)
2006
Antrim Hurling League Division 4 (1)
2021
Ulster Minor Hurling Sevens (1)
Ulster GAA writers Club of the Year (1)
1992

Notable players
 Paddy Cunningham
 Declan Lynch, captained Antrim

 John Finucane

Frankie Wilson

References

External links
 Lámh Dhearg GAA Club

Gaelic games clubs in County Antrim
Hurling clubs in County Antrim
Sports clubs in Belfast